Calvin J. Spann (November 28, 1924 – September 6, 2015) was one of the original Tuskegee Airmen, a fighter pilot with the 100th Fighter Squadron of the 332nd Fighter Group. Spann received his wings from the Tuskegee Flight School as a part of graduating class 44G. As a member of the United States Army Air Corps, he served in Europe during World War II, where Spann flew 26 combat missions before the end of the war in the European Theater.

Education

He attended Rutherford High School.

Military career

During Spann's wartime service (1944–1946), he was assigned to the 332nd Fighter Group under the command of Colonel Benjamin O. Davis Jr., who on September 2, 1941, was the first African American officer to solo an aircraft under the U.S. Army Air Corps. Davis would later rise to the rank of general in the United States Air Force.
While assigned to the 332nd, he flew in the longest bomber escort mission of 15th Air Force, a 1600-mile round trip mission on March 24, 1945, from Ramitelli, Italy, to Berlin, Germany, to destroy a Daimler-Benz manufacturing facility under the leadership of squadron commander Captain Roscoe Brown.

Later life

Later in his life, Spann spoke at schools, churches and organizations about the Tuskegee Airmen experience and how their courage and valor helped them to triumph. During these speeches, he encouraged students to make a commitment to excel in the study of mathematics and science, and reminding them that through preparation and perseverance they can succeed.

Spann lived in Englewood, New Jersey, and worked in the pharmaceutical industry. Spann died on September 6, 2015, at the age of 90 in McKinney, Texas, where he had moved in 2006 to be close to his daughter, Carla Spann and his grandchildren Carson and Cameron. He is buried in East Ridgelawn Cemetery in Clifton, New Jersey.

Military awards
The Air Medal with Oak Leaf Cluster
A Presidential Unit Citation
The European/African/Middle Eastern Campaign Ribbon
The American Campaign Ribbon
The World War II Victory Medal 
The Congressional Gold Medal (Tuskegee Airmen)

See also
 Dogfights (TV series)
 Executive Order 9981
 Freeman Field Mutiny
 List of Tuskegee Airmen
 Military history of African Americans
 The Tuskegee Airmen (movie)

References

Further reading
Freedom Flyers The Tuskegee Airmen of World War II   by Moye, J. Todd
Boundless  Sky "The Journey of LT. Calvin Spann, Tuskegee Airman  Author Calvin J Spann, Written by: Jonathan Singleton, Created by Lindell Singleton

External links

Northdallasgazette.com
Northtexas.va.gov
Tuskegeeairmen.org
Wfaa.com
Americanveteranscenter.org
Aafha.org
Kera.org
Ireprot.cnn.com
Ntxe-news.com
Jclibrary.org
Allentx.swagit.com
Kirtland.af.mil

1924 births
Tuskegee Airmen
2015 deaths
United States Air Force generals
People from Rutherford, New Jersey
People from Englewood, New Jersey
People from McKinney, Texas
Rutherford High School (New Jersey) alumni
United States Army Air Forces pilots of World War II
21st-century African-American people
Military personnel from Texas
Military personnel from New Jersey